Suphisellus levis is a species of burrowing water beetle in the subfamily Noterinae. It was described by Fall in 1909 and is found in Mexico.

References

Suphisellus
Beetles described in 1909